This is a chronological list of Latvian artists working in visual media who were born or whose creative production is associated with Latvia:

Elise von Jung-Stilling (1829-1904) Painter, founder of a private painting school in Riga
Kārlis Hūns (1831-1877) Painter
Ādams Alksnis (1864-1897) Painter
Vilhelms Purvītis (1872-1945) Painter, Founder of the Latvian Academy of the Arts
Emīlija Gruzīte (1873-1945) Painter
Maurice Sterne (1878-1957) Painter
Hugo Kārlis Grotuss (1884-1969) Painter
Frédéric Fiebig (1885-1953) Painter
Leo Michelson (1887-1978) Painter
Jazeps Grosvalds (1891-1969) Painter
Aleksandra Belcova (1892-1981) Painter
Arvīds Brastiņš (1893-1984) Sculptor
Jēkabs Bīne (1895-1955) Painter and stained glass artist
Uga Skulme (1895-1963) Painter
Jēkabs Kazaks (1895-1920) Painter
Romans Suta (1896-1944) Painter, graphic artist, stage designer and art theoretician
Hilda Vīka (1897-1963) Painter and illustrator
Julius Matisons (1898-1978) Painter
Mark Rothko (1903-1970) Painter
Philippe Halsman (1906-1979) Photographer
Lucia Peka (1912-1991) Painter
Arnold Mikelson (1922-1984) Wood sculptor
Aina Apse (1926–2015) Potter
Vija Celmins (born 1939) Painter
Tatyana Palchuk (born 1954) Painter
Nele Zirnite (born 1959) Printmaker
Ilgvars Zalans (born 1962) Painter, action painting performer
Arturs Akopjans (born 1969) Painter

See also
List of painters from Latvia
List of Latvian sculptors
Culture of Latvia

Artists
Latvia
List